George Read may refer to:

 George Reade (colonial governor) (1608–1671), politician, judge, and Acting Governor of Virginia Colony
 George Read (American politician, born 1733) (1733–1798), lawyer, signer of Declaration of Independence and U.S. Senator from Delaware
 George Read Jr. (1765–1836), lawyer, son of George Read, Sr., U.S. Attorney for the state of Delaware
 George Read III (1787–1836), lawyer, son of George Read, Jr., U.S. Attorney for the state of Delaware
 George Read (Alberta politician) (born 1972), politician and former leader of the Alberta Green Party
 George Read (Ontario politician) (1819–1903), businessman and Member of Parliament from Ontario
 George Read (New Zealand politician) (1814–1878), New Zealand politician
 George C. Read (1788–1862), sailor and American Rear-Admiral
 George E. Read (1838–1910), sailor and American Medal of Honor recipient
 George Windle Read (1860–1934), U.S. Army general
 George Windle Read Jr. (1900–1974), U.S. Army general

See also
 George Reid (disambiguation)
 George Reed (disambiguation)
 George Reade (1687–1756), soldier
 George Read II House, historic home of the son of U.S. statesman George Read